Michael Schultz (born November 10, 1938) is an American director and producer of theater, film and television.

Life and career
Schultz was born in Milwaukee, Wisconsin, the son of an African-American mother Katherine Frances Leslie (1917-1995),  and Leo Albert Schultz (1913-2001), an insurance salesman of German descent.  Shortly before his birth his parents married in Iowa, where both were listed as black on their marriage license. Mr. Schultz's occupation was listed as "Musician" at the time of his marriage.

Michael Schultz, who was known as "Mike" growing up, attended Riverside High School in Milwaukee, where he was a very active student. He played baseball, football and participated in student theater productions.

After his undergraduate work at the University of Wisconsin–Madison and Marquette University, he attended Princeton University, where in 1966 he directed his first play, a production of Waiting for Godot. He joined the Negro Ensemble Company in 1968, which brought him to Broadway in 1969. His breakthrough was directing Lorraine Hansberry's To Be Young, Gifted and Black, which he restaged for television in 1972.

Schultz' earliest film projects combined low comedy with profound social comment (Honeybaby, Honeybaby and Cooley High), reaching a peak with the ensemble comedy Car Wash (1976) and Which Way Is Up? (1977), starring Richard Pryor.

In 1978, Schultz took the reins of the musical Sergeant Pepper's Lonely Hearts Club Band with the largest budget ever entrusted to an African-American film director to that date. However, upon its release, the project was a commercial and critical failure. Schultz made the ensemble comedy Scavenger Hunt (1979), Denzel Washington's film debut Carbon Copy (1981), and the screwball comedy Disorderlies (1987). On July 23, 1986, Michael Schultz formed his own production company Crystalite Productions, with his wife Gloria Schultz, and wanted to start producing three features in development.

More recently, Schultz has worked in television, piloting episodes of such style-conscious series as The Young Indiana Jones Chronicles and Picket Fences, as well as an abundance of TV movies.

In 1991, Schultz was inducted into the Black Filmmakers Hall of Fame.

Personal life

Schultz married Gloria Jones in Brooklyn, New York in 1965. As an actress his wife is known professionally as Lauren Jones. In non-acting capacities, she is known as Gloria Schultz. The couple have two children.

Filmography

Television
To Be Young, Gifted, and Black (1972)
The Rockford Files (1974) TV Series
Starsky and Hutch (1975) TV Series
Baretta (1975) TV Series
Benny's Place (1982)
For Us the Living: The Medgar Evers Story (1983)
The Jerk, Too (1984)
The Spirit (1987)
Timestalkers (1987)
Rock 'n' Roll Mom (1988)
Tarzan in Manhattan (1989)
Hammer, Slammer, & Slade (1990)
Jury Duty: The Comedy (1990)
Day-O (1992)
Diagnosis: Murder (1993) TV Series
Young Indiana Jones and the Hollywood Follies (1994)
Chicago Hope (1994) TV Series
Shock Treatment (1995)
Young Indiana Jones: Travels with Father (1996)
Ally McBeal (1997) TV Series
The Practice (1997) TV Series
Killers in the House (1998)
My Last Love (1999)
Ally (1999) TV Series
The Adventures of Young Indiana Jones: Tales of Innocence (1999)
Philly (2001) TV Series
L.A. Law: The Movie (2002)
Everwood (TV Series)
Brothers and sisters TV Series
Cold Case (2006) TV Series
Eli Stone (2007) TV Series
Dirty Sexy Money (2007) TV Series
Chuck (2010) TV Series
Arrow (2012–17) TV series
The Mysteries of Laura (2014) TV series
Black-ish (2015–17) TV series
Crazy Ex-Girlfriend (2016) TV series
New Girl (2016–18) TV series 
Star (2017) TV series 
Once Upon a Time (2017) TV series
Step Up: High Water (2018) TV series
Black Lightning (2018–20) TV series
Code Black (2018) TV series
Manifest (2018) TV series 
All American (2019–22) TV series 
 All American: Homecoming (2022-23) TV series

Film
Together for Days (1972)
Honeybaby, Honeybaby (1974)
Cooley High (1975)
Car Wash (1976)
Greased Lightning (1977)
Which Way Is Up? (1977)
Sergeant Pepper's Lonely Hearts Club Band (1978)
Scavenger Hunt (1979)
Bustin' Loose (1981)
Carbon Copy (1981)
Krush Groove (1985)
The Last Dragon (1985)
Disorderlies (1987)
White Girl (1990)
Livin' Large! (1991)
Nikita's Blues (1999)
Dreamers (2000)
Woman Thou Art Loosed (2004)

Theatre
God is a (Guess What?) (1968)
Kongi's Harvest (1968)
Song of the Lusitanian Bogey (1968) Obie Award, Best Director
The Reckoning (1969)
Does a Tiger Wear a Necktie? (1969)
Operation Sidewinder (1970)
The Dream on Monkey Mountain (1971)
The Cherry Orchard (1972)
Thoughts (1973)
What the Wine-Sellers Buy (1974)
Mule Bone (1991)

References

External links
 
 

1938 births
African-American film directors
African-American film producers
African-American television directors
American people of German descent
American television directors
American television producers
American theatre directors
Drama Desk Award winners
Film directors from Wisconsin
Living people
Artists from Milwaukee
University of Wisconsin–Madison alumni
Film producers from Wisconsin
21st-century African-American people
20th-century African-American people